Michael Curtis is a television producer and writer known for Friends and Disney Channel's Phil of the Future and Jonas.

Early life 
A Navy brat from year zero, Michael John Curtis was born at the Naval Submarine Base New London in Connecticut.  He lived in various locations around the United States including Charleston, South Carolina, Dam Neck Naval Base (Training Support Center Hampton Roads), Virginia, and overseas in Wollongong, Australia.  Curtis attended White Point Elementary School in San Pedro, California (where he was awarded "Most Books Read") for 5th grade. and Fallbrook Union High School in Fallbrook, California.

Career 
He was a writer and executive producer of Friends during seasons 2 to 5 and also executive producer (with Roger S. H. Schulman) of Disney Channel's Phil of the Future (season 2, but not season 1). In 2008–2009 he worked with the Jonas Brothers and the Disney Channel as executive producer and co-creator of the series Jonas (Emmy Award nominated season 1, but not season 2). He co-wrote the biblical mockumentary The Making of '...And God Spoke' which had its theatrical debut at the Sundance Film Festival, and directed the series finale of Phil of the Future, "Back to the Future (Not the Movie)" and the season 1 finale of Jonas,  "Double Date".  He was co-founder of "Mantis Productions" (2007–2017) alongside Roger S.H. Schulman, co-creator of Jonas and the actual writer of Shrek.}

In 2009, Curtis earned a PhD in religion from the Universal Life Church.

Filmography

Film

Television

References

External links 
 

Living people
American television producers
American television writers
American male television writers
San Francisco State University alumni
Year of birth missing (living people)